(3,5-dihydroxyphenyl)acetyl-CoA 1,2-dioxygenase (DpgC) is an enzyme catalyses the following chemical reaction

 (3,5-dihydroxyphenyl)acetyl-CoA + O  2-(3,5-dihydroxyphenyl)-2-oxoacetate + CoA.

This enzyme is involved in the biosynthesis of the nonproteinogenic amino acid (S)-3,5-dihydroxyphenylglycine (Dpg) responsible of the production of vancomycin and teicoplanin antibiotics. It catalyzes the unusual conversion 3,5-dihydroxyphenylacetyl-CoA (DPA-CoA) to 3,5-dihydroxyphenylglyoxylate.

References 

EC 1.13.11